Woodland poppy may refer to:

 Stylophorum diphyllum, an eastern North-American species
 Meconopsis villosa, a Himalayan species